In enzymology, a 2,5-dioxopiperazine hydrolase is an enzyme that catalyzes the chemical reaction

2,5-dioxopiperazine + H2O  glycylglycine

Thus, the two substrates of this enzyme are 2,5-dioxopiperazine and H2O, whereas its product is glycylglycine.

This enzyme belongs to the family of hydrolases, those acting on carbon-nitrogen bonds other than peptide bonds, specifically in cyclic amides.  The systematic name of this enzyme class is 2,5-dioxopiperazine amidohydrolase. Other names in common use include cyclo(Gly-Gly) hydrolase, and cyclo(glycylglycine) hydrolase.

References

 

EC 3.5.2
Enzymes of unknown structure